Wicker Park is a  4.03 acre public urban park in the Wicker Park neighborhood of the West Town community and West Side district, in Chicago, Illinois. It is named after Charles G. Wicker and Joel H. Wicker.

History 
In late 1868, the Chicago Board of Public Works announced the desire to build a park "lying west of Milwaukee Avenue and south of North Avenue. The grounds are of considerable capacity and are laid out in a tasteful and attractive manner as a park." Present at the meeting was alderman Charles G. Wicker, who, with his brother Joel H. Wicker, purchased a  parcel of land to the City of Chicago in 1870.  The City of Chicago installed a small reservoir inside the triangular park.

At the end of the 19th century the neighborhood around the park was subsumed into the surrounding Polish Downtown, and the area immediately surrounding the park became known as "the Polish Gold Coast".

In 1890 the West Park Commission filled in the reservoir and replaced it with lawn. Several years later a cut-granite fountain was installed. In 1908 the fountain was replaced with a wading pool and additional trees were planted in the park.

In 1934 the West Park Commission was consolidated into the Chicago Park District. The Chicago Park District installed a fieldhouse on the site in 1985.

Facilities 
The dog-friendly park includes areas for baseball, gyms, a spraypool, a water playground, and a walking path.

See also 
West Town, Chicago
Parks of Chicago

References

External links
 Official Wicker Park website

Parks in Chicago
West Side, Chicago
1870 establishments in Illinois